The 2020 Super Formula Lights Championship was the first Super Formula Lights Championship season, after the Japanese Formula 3 Championship was rebranded following the end of the 2019 season.  It was rebranded because of FIA nomenclature regulations (all regional F3 series were rebranded "Formula Regional," with the European series in 2019 and North American series in 2020;  the Formula Regional branding went to another promoter) and a switch to Euroformula Open Championship specification Dallara 320 chassis and similar regulations, which are different from FIA-approved Formula Regional.

Teams and drivers

Race calendar 
The race calendar for the 2020 season was revealed on September 11, 2019. All rounds supported the Super Formula Championship. After multiple postponements due to the COVID-19 pandemic, a revised calendar was announced on 10 June 2020, which had the season start at the end of August and finish in late December.

Championship standings 

 Each driver's final point totals were based on their 14 best results.  The points were awarded as follows:

Drivers' Championships

Overall

Masters Class

References

External links
Super Formula Lights official website – Japanese / English

Japanese Formula 3 Championship
Super Formula Lights
Super Formula Lights